Suitcase is the ninth studio album by Delta blues artist Keb' Mo' (real name Kevin Moore) released in June 2006. Suitcase sees Moore re-unite with producer John Porter who helped Moore put together his first few commercial releases up to Slow Down, where the two started working on projects with others. In this lieu, Moore worked with a variety of producers gaining a varied production experience, along with producing himself. In this time, Porter (who even prior to collaborating with Moore on Keb' Mo' was a highly experienced producer) moved into new areas of production and produced artists such as Taj Mahal, Bob Dylan and others. The critical and consumer response to this album is higher than the previous few albums by Moore and this can be traced to the reunion of the two, among other factors.

One song on the album, "I See Love", was used as the theme song to the CBS television comedy series Mike & Molly, which aired from 2010 to 2016.

Track listing
All songs written by Kevin Moore (Keb' Mo') unless otherwise noted.
 "Your Love"
 "The Itch" (Keb' Mo', Jeff Paris)
 "Eileen"
 "Remain Silent" (Keb' Mo', Alan Rich)
 "Still There For Me"
 "Rita"
 "I'm A Hero" (Keb' Mo', James Ingram)
 "Suitcase" (Keb' Mo', Jenny Yates)
 "Whole 'Nutha Thang" (Keb' Mo', Mac Davis)
 "I See Love" (Keb' Mo', Josh Kelley)
 "I'll Be Your Water" (Keb' Mo', John Lewis Parker)
 "Life Is Beautiful" (Keb' Mo', Colin Linden)

Personnel
Keb' Mo' - Electric Guitar, National Steel Guitar (tr.1), Resonator Guitar Pogreba, Rhythm Guitar (tr.2), guitar, Dobro (steel) (tr.3), Acoustic Guitar (tr.5), Banjo, Resonator Guitar Pogreba (tr. 4)
Fran Banish - Electric Guitar (tr. 1,4-6 Guitar (Volume Swells) (tr.3), Acoustic Guitar
Mike Finnigan - Organ Hammond B3 (tr.1, 3, 5, 6)
Reggie McBride - Bass, Upright Bass
Sergio Gonzalez - Drums
Kat Dyson - Guitar Leslie (tr.2) 
Jeff Paris - Electric Piano Wurlitzer (tr.2, 4), Mandolin
Jon Cleary - Piano, Hammond B3 (tr. 2), Wurlitzer Electric Piano (tr.6), organ (Hammond B3) (tr.4)
Steve Ferrone - Drums (tr.2)
Paulinho Da Costa - Percussion
Sir Harry Bowens - Vocals
Sweetpea Atkinson - Vocals
Vince Bonham - Vocals
Vida Simon - Vocals
Greg Leisz - Pedal Steel Guitar (tr.4, 6)( 
Darrell Leonard - Trumpet, Trombone
Joe Sublett - Tenor Saxophone
Terry Wollman - Electric guitar (barritone)
James Ingram - Vocals
Paul Oscher - Harp
Greg Tardy - Clarinet
John Porter - Mandolin Solo on "Life Is Beautiful"

External links
 Tab for the song "Suitcase."

2006 albums
Keb' Mo' albums
Epic Records albums
Albums recorded at Shangri-La (recording studio)